The 1912 Central Michigan Normalites football team represented Central Michigan Normal School, later renamed Central Michigan University, as an independent during the 1912 college football season. In their fourth and final season under head coach Harry Helmer, the Central Michigan football team compiled a 1–2–2 record, failed to score a point in four of five games, and were outscored by their opponents by a combined total of 112 to 6. The team's sole victory was by a 6-0 score over the Michigan School for the Deaf from Flint, Michigan.

The team's quarterback Tip Carnahan broke his collarbone during a practice on October 4.

Schedule

References

Central Michigan
Central Michigan Chippewas football seasons
Central Michigan Normalites football